Jining District is an urban district that serves as the administrative seat of Ulanqab, a region governed as a prefecture-level city in the mid-western part of Inner Mongolia, China. It has an area of approximately 114.2 km2 and is in the southern foothills of the Yinshan mountains.

As of 2011, it had a population of roughly 377,100, including members of the Mongol, Hui, Manchu, Daur, Tibetan, Uyghur, Hmong, and Yi national minorities.

Administratively speaking, Ulanqab is a "city" and Jining a "district", in reality Jining is a de facto city, while Ulanqab is an administrative division covering a much larger area. See prefecture-level city for more information on this arrangement.

Jining South Railway Station serves as a railway intersection to the border town of Erenhot to the north, Hohhot and Baotou to the west, and Shanxi province's Datong to the south.

History

Recorded human activity in the Jining area dates back to the Shang dynasty. It was originally named Bingzhou. In the Song dynasty it was part of the Yunzhong Commandery; it was placed under the administration of Datong during the Jin dynasty (1115–1234). During the Yuan dynasty, it was named "Jining" for the first time. In 1675, the Jining area was placed under the administration of the Plain Yellow Banner of Chahar Province, and in 1750 was transferred to Fengzhen City's administration.  In 1922, it was renamed Jining and became a municipality, and the following year a county.  In 1948 Jining fell under the control of the Communist Party.  The urban core was subsequently renamed Chengguan Town (roughly, "urban district"), then Pingdiquan Town, then finally back to Jining in April 1956.

In 2004, Ulanqab League, to which it is the seat of government, was 'converted' to a prefecture-level city, and Jining is correspondingly changed from a county-level city to a district. Ulanqab is named Chaborte in the writings of P. Evariste Huc.

Transportation
Jining is a major transport node in central Inner Mongolia. It is on the Beijing-Baotou railway, and the terminus of the Jining-Erenhot Railway, making the city a short connection away from urban centres such as Hohhot, Baotou, Zhangjiakou, Datong, and Beijing.  High-speed rail access is available to Hohhot and Baotou; travel time to the regional capital is approximately an hour.

Jining is also on the route of China National Highway 208, China National Highway 110, and the G6 Beijing–Lhasa Expressway.

Intercity buses are available to neighboring cities and towns.

Natural resources
The Jining area is a source of limestone and turquoise.

Ulanqab
County-level divisions of Inner Mongolia